Demetrida moesta is a species of ground beetle in Lebiinae subfamily. It was described by Sharp in 1878 and is endemic to New Zealand.

References

Beetles described in 1878
Beetles of New Zealand
moesta